Robert Opel (born Robert Oppel; October 23, 1939 – July 7, 1979) was an American photographer and art gallery owner most famous as the man who streaked during the 46th Academy Awards in 1974.

Biography
Opel was born in East Orange, New Jersey, in October 1939. As a child, he lived in Canada, Kansas, and Kentucky before his family settled in Pittsburgh, Pennsylvania, where he attended grade school, high school, and college. Born Robert Oppel, he dropped the second "p" from his name after becoming an activist to distance himself from his family in Pittsburgh. Opel was concerned his activities would cause the family embarrassment.

In college, Opel was elected to Student Congress, and served as chairman of a regional debate team. After graduation, he worked as a speechwriter for then-California Governor Ronald Reagan. In 1974, Opel taught English as a second language for the Los Angeles City Unified School District. He was fired from that job following the Oscars incident.

Opel owned his own photography business, Ideas Photographic. Among his clients were the LGBT publication The Advocate and Finger magazine, where he was also an editor.

In 1976, he announced his candidacy for the U.S. Presidency, using the slogans "Nothing to Hide" and "Not Just Another Crooked Dick," referring to his streaking incidents and President Richard Nixon, respectively (Nixon had resigned from office in disgrace in 1974.)

In March 1978, Opel opened Fey Way Studios, a gallery of gay male art, at 1287 Howard Street in San Francisco. The gallery helped bring such erotic gay artists as Tom of Finland and Robert Mapplethorpe to national attention and showed others, such as Rex.

In 1979, he was in a relationship with Camille O'Grady, till his death the same year.

Streaking incident at the 1974 Oscars
On April 2, 1974, Opel apparently snuck backstage posing as a journalist to gain entry to the stage at the 46th Academy Awards show at the Dorothy Chandler Pavilion in Los Angeles. He ran naked past David Niven flashing a peace sign while Niven was introducing Elizabeth Taylor.

After breaking into laughter momentarily, Niven regained his composure, turned to the audience and quipped, "Well, ladies and gentlemen, that was almost bound to happen... But isn't it fascinating to think that probably the only laugh that man will ever get in his life is by stripping off and showing his shortcomings?"

Later, some evidence arose suggesting that Opel's appearance was facilitated by the show's producer, Jack Haley, Jr., as a stunt. Robert Metzler, the show's business manager, believed that the incident had been planned in some way. He said that, during the dress rehearsal, Niven had asked Metzler's wife to borrow a pen so he could write down the famous ad-lib. Opel apparently had to cut through an expensive background curtain in to reach the stage.

The episode made Opel something of a celebrity. Producer Allan Carr even asked him to streak at a party for Rudolf Nureyev.

Death
Opel was murdered on the night of July 7, 1979, during an attempted robbery of his San Francisco studio by Robert E. Kelly and Maurice Keenan. He was 39. Kelly was sentenced to 25 years to life. Keenan was sentenced to death, but the sentence was later commuted to life imprisonment. , Keenan is serving a life sentence for the murder.

Remembrances
Opel's nephew, Robert Oppel, is the director of Uncle Bob, a 2010 documentary about the life and death of his uncle. The movie features Oppel as narrator, and includes interviews with John Waters, Divine, Danny Nicoletta, and others in the San Francisco scene who knew Opel. Oppel attempted to interview several people in connection with his uncle's murder, including the two men serving life in prison for the crime, but was denied a meeting by the prison.

On February 14, 2014, Robert Oppel and curator Rick Castro installed and premiered "Robert Opel: The Res-erection of Fey Way Studios", an art show at Antebellum gallery in Hollywood, California, featuring original artworks, posters and memorabilia from Fey Way Studios circa 1978–1979.

Opel was honored in 2017 along with other notables, named on bronze bootprints, as part of San Francisco South of Market Leather History Alley.

References

Biography from Matt & Andrej Koymasky
David Niven at the IMDb (contains above version of Niven's quote)
"Biron on Robert Opel and other artists", Interview by Philip Vincent, San Francisco, 1996. Retrieved 12 June 2007.
 The Gay Book of Lists,  By Leigh W. Rutledge, 2003, . Google books link.

External links
Documentary Film, Uncle Bob.
The Life of Robert Opel @WFMU
Robert Opel's Fey-Way Studios:San Francisco SOMA male erotic gallery

1939 births
1979 deaths
People from East Orange, New Jersey
1979 murders in the United States
20th-century American artists
American murder victims
Artists from New Jersey
Artists from Pittsburgh
Artists from San Francisco
Deaths by firearm in California
Educators from California
Bisexual artists 
American LGBT photographers
LGBT people from California
People murdered in California
Photographers from California
Streakers
Educators from Pennsylvania
Educators from New Jersey
Art gallery owners
20th-century American LGBT people